Fritz Roderfeld (born 31 July 1943) is a German sprinter. He competed in the men's 200 metres at the 1964 Summer Olympics.

References

1943 births
Living people
Athletes (track and field) at the 1964 Summer Olympics
German male sprinters
Olympic athletes of the United Team of Germany
Place of birth missing (living people)